Thaleia  is a genus of very small ectoparasitic sea snails, marine gastropod mollusks or micromollusks in   the Eulimidae family.

Species
Species within the genera Thaleia  include:
 Thaleia mucronetincta (Thiele, 1925)
 Thaleia nisonis (Dall, 1889)

References

Eulimidae